Ayqer Chaman-e Sofla (also Romanized as Āyqer Chaman-e Soflá; also known as Āyqer Chaman-e Do) is a village in Mehranrud-e Jonubi Rural District, in the Central District of Bostanabad County, East Azerbaijan Province, Iran. At the 2006 census, its population was 60, in 9 families.

References 

Populated places in Bostanabad County